Javier Sylvester Martina (born 1 February 1987) is a Curaçaoan-Dutch footballer who plays as a winger for A.V.V. Zeeburgia in the Dutch Hoofdklasse, and for the Curaçao national team.

Club career

Netherlands
Born in Willemstad, Netherlands Antilles (now known as Curaçao), Martina began his career with SV Bijlmer (Amsterdam, Netherlands). After two years, he joined Amstelveen Heemraad in the summer of 2001. In July 2003, he left Amsteleen Heemraad to sign for FC Omniworld, from where he was scouted by Jong AFC Ajax in the summer of 2005.

He played three years for the AFC Ajax youth team, before he was promoted to the Eredivisie team in June 2008. The highly rated right winger made his official Ajax debut in the 2008 season in a 2–0 Eredivisie win against Twente. Martina started the match and assisted on his club's first goal of the match. In Summer 2009, he was linked with a move to Italian side Bari. In January 2010 he was sent on loan to HFC Haarlem playing only one game before the team went bankrupt. He returned to Jong Ajax before he was released in the summer of 2010.

After being released by Ajax, Martina continued to train with Ajax and went on trial with Zwolle after manager Art Langeler saw Martina can play in wings and was keen to sign him. Martina went on trial with Willem II, hoping to win a contract. But on 4 January, Martina ended a trial with Willem II.

Canada
In January 2011, Martina joined Canadian club Toronto FC of Major League Soccer on trial for their pre-season in Antalya, Turkey. On 15 February 2011 it was reported that he had agreed to terms with the Canadian club. However it was not officially announced by the Canadian club until 9 March 2011. Martina was one of three Dutch players signed by Toronto, both Nick Soolsma and Elbekay Bouchiba also joined the club. Martina made his debut for the team on 19 March 2011 versus Vancouver Whitecaps FC in the first all Canadian match-up in the league. One week later during the second game of the season Martina scored two goals against Portland, leading Toronto to a 2–0 home victory. Martina's second goal of the match was a one touch volley direct from goalkeeper Stefan Frei, which earned him MLS Goal of the Week honours. Throughout the rest of the season, Martina was soon less successful and failed to make an impact as he went to make 21 appearances.

Martina was waived by Toronto on 23 November 2011.

Return to Netherlands
Ahead of a new season in 2012–13, Martina desired to continue his career in Eerste Divisie, by playing for Dordrecht and was signed for them on 22 August 2012, with a one-year contract. Martina made his debut on 1 October 2012, coming on as a substitute, in a 3–0 win over Helmond Sport.

International career 
He was a member of the Netherlands U-20 team at the 2007 Toulon Tournament. Martina was called up by his country of birth, Curaçao for 2014 World Cup qualifying in September 2011

Personal life
His brother Cuco is also a footballer.

References

External links

AFC Ajax profile
Ajax Inside Profile

1987 births
Living people
Curaçao footballers
Curaçao expatriate footballers
Curaçao international footballers
Dutch footballers
Dutch people of Curaçao descent
Eredivisie players
Eerste Divisie players
Derde Divisie players
Major League Soccer players
Almere City FC players
AFC Ajax players
HFC Haarlem players
Toronto FC players
FC Dordrecht players
People from Willemstad
Expatriate soccer players in Canada
Netherlands youth international footballers
Association football midfielders